In the 2021–22 season, USM Alger was competing in the Ligue 1 for the 44th season.  It was their 27th consecutive season in the top flight of Algerian football. They competed in Ligue 1.

Season summary
Achour Djelloul spoke on Channel 3, made some revelations about recruitment and departures. While affirming that USM Alger will play the leading roles next season, Djelloul reveals that Denis Lavagne will be the new coach of Soustara's. also said that he would like to keep Mounir Zeghdoud with the team as an assistant, while Mohamed Lamine Zemmamouche who is at the end of his career, said we will prepare him to be a goalkeeper coach in the future. Returning to Antar Yahia case, it is first and foremost the relationship between an employer and an employee. Add to that Yahia was punished twice by the Disciplinary Committee, and for this we preferred to separate ourselves from this employee. The club's first deals were goalkeeper Oussama Benbot then contracted with ES Sétif duo Messala Merbah and Ibrahim Bekakchi, The fourth deal was the former player Abderrahmane Meziane coming from Espérance de Tunis and after great negotiations about the salary, they agreed for 260 million per month for two seasons. 

On 1 September, USM Alger signed with the former player Hocine Achiou to be the new sporting director and Azzedine Rahim was appointed as assistant to Lavagne and Lounès Gaouaoui as goalkeepers coach. On 10 September, Saadi Yacef passed away at the age of 93, who was one of the leaders of Algeria's National Liberation Front during his country's war of independence, president of the club in the seventies and honorary president. On 14 September, team captain Mohamed Lamine Zemmamouche renewed his contract for two seasons and is considered the most player who played in the history of the club, with 400 games in sixteen seasons, and stated that he wanted to retire here. The first preparatory will be in Mostaganem for a ten-day internship like last season from September 19 to 28, is a very important step in the preparation for the offseason and include two friendly matches. On 18 October, Pr. Riyad Mehiaoui, member of the scientific committee monitoring the evolution of the COVID-19 pandemic in Algeria, said his organization was in favor of the return of supporters to the stadiums, 19 months after their absence. On 20 October, Hocine Achiou sighed with relief after Mazire Soula finally terminated his contract with USMA. Since the squad has 27 players, management can qualify all new recruits the Franco-Algerian striker refused to leave. After several rounds of negotiation, Achiou and the player failed to agree on an amicable separation. The latter demanded first, compensation that covers the remainder of his lease, which expires on September 28, 2023, in order to sign the termination of his contract.

On October 23, USM Alger opened the season against NA Hussein Dey outside the home and tied 1–1. USMA opened the scoring through Abderrahim Hamra in the 42nd minute, and before that Ismail Belkacemi missed a penalty kick. On the 30th of the same month, in the first match at Omar Hamadi Stadium, the fans of Ouled EL Bahdja raised a banner to honor Saadi Yacef, who died about two months ago. USM Alger achieved a great victory against RC Arbaâ by four goals scored by Belkacemi, Mahious, Zouari and Belaïd. The visiting team played with a squad of reserve players, which Hocine Achiou did not like it. On November 20, against the leader US Biskra they won by three including a brace from Benhammouda, US Biskra was forced to play with the reserve team due to the Players protested for not receiving their dues. On November 16, Soolking feat Rim'K released a song Her name is Lela, some of which were filmed at Omar Hamadi Stadium with the supporters of USM Alger, Soolking is known as a big fan of The Reds and Blacks. On November 28, the medical staff announced the end of the season for Hamza Koudri, after the injury he received against US Biskra with a twisting of the left knee and a rupture of the cruciate ligament. Before the MC Oran match, Ouled EL Bahdja decided to raise a banner in support of Koudri, but the club's management prevented them and according to the group it was Achiou who refused, and after stumbling against them, USM Alger decided to terminate the contract with Denis Lavagne due to poor results. Achiou stated that they will not rush to sign a new coach, who should be worthy of the club's philosophy, Lavagne asked for 198,000 euros after unilateral termination of the contract or to go to FIFA. On December 26, left-back Mehdi Beneddine moved to LB Châteauroux on a six months loan. After winning against Paradou AC, interim coach Azzedine Rahim stated that he does not want to burn the stages and in order to be a head coach you must go through several stages.

On February 6, 2022, the former player in the seventies and eighties Abdelmalek Ali Messaoud died at the age of 66 due to complications from the COVID-19 pandemic in Algeria, and in his career with USM Alger, Ali Messaoud won the Algerian Cup title in 1981 and with the national team two gold medals for the Mediterranean Games in 1975 and the African Games in 1978. After the end of the first stage led by a temporary coach for more than a month, USM Alger contracted with Serbian Zlatko Krmpotić with Moroccan assistant Djamil Ben Ouahi, Krmpotić who has coached several clubs in Africa, will sign a 6-month contract and could be renewed in the event of a place in the league standings at the end of the season. On March 5, in a match against JS Saoura, USM Alger stumbled in a goalless draw and the match witnessed the cancellation of a goal for Al-Ittihad due to the offside situation, and with the replay it was found that the goal was correct, the sports director stated that he will not turn his back on the team and will play for the title, and that there are people within the team as if we were playing for the fall and not in third place, Mustapha Ghorbal who managed a fateful match in Saudi Arabia is not the same as the one who managed our match. After a series of negative results and seven consecutive matches without a win, On April 15, USM Alger decided to terminate the services of sports director Hocine Achiou, Asked on national radio about a possible withdrawal from Groupe SERPORT, Achour Djelloul assured that the public company had no intention of separating from USM Alger. Three days after the defeat against MC Oran, Krmpotić was dismissed from his position and USM Alger decided to rely on his assistant Jamil Benouahi to complete the season. 

On May 6, Achour Djelloul stated for National Radio that several players will be laid off and will rely on young players such as Abderraouf Othmani and Mohamed Ait El Hadj in the next season. and that those who promote the return of Saïd Allik do not want the best for the club and that they will give up the position of sports director. Djelloul said that Réda Abdouche will be with the club next season and his role will be administrative and technical, and that they officially requested to take advantage of Baraki Stadium and that Groupe SERPORT is ready to carry out the remaining works in order to receive it as soon as possible, because Omar Hamadi Stadium has become a danger to the supporters. days later Djelloul was dismissed from his post after the scandal of the exit of containers of Hyundai cars imported by the Tahkout company in 2019, and was replaced by the former CEO of  l’entreprise portuaire d’annaba (EPAN) Abdelkarim Harkati temporarily. USM Alger achieved their first victory after two months against WA Tlemcen, then in the Algiers Derby they achieved an important and unexpected victory that allowed them to search for a continental participation, and after achieving the fifth victory in a row against Olympique de Médéa Jamil Benouahi stated that he wishes to stay in the club and that he became a fan of the team. On June 9, 2022 After the end of the Algeria A' match against DR Congo A', Madjid Bougherra decided to lay off the players for one day. Billel Benhammouda called his friend to take him home. On the road between Douaouda and Bou Ismaïl, he had a fatal traffic accident. The next day after a DNA examination his death was announced Benhammouda died at the age of 24. While they moved to Setif to play the last round match the team returned after hearing this collision news, Ligue de Football Professionnel (LFP) granted the request to postpone the match to a later date.

Pre-season and friendlies

Competitions

Overview

{| class="wikitable" style="text-align: center"
|-
!rowspan=2|Competition
!colspan=8|Record
!rowspan=2|Started round
!rowspan=2|Final position / round
!rowspan=2|First match	
!rowspan=2|Last match
|-
!
!
!
!
!
!
!
!
|-
| Ligue 1

|  
| 4th
| 23 October 2021
| 17 June 2022
|-
! Total

Ligue 1

League table

Results summary

Results by round

Matches
The league fixtures were announced on 7 October 2021.

Squad information

Playing statistics

Appearances (Apps.) numbers are for appearances in competitive games only including sub appearances
Red card numbers denote:   Numbers in parentheses represent red cards overturned for wrongful dismissal.
{| class="wikitable sortable alternance"  style="font-size:80%; text-align:center; line-height:14px; width:100%;"
|-
! rowspan="2" style="width:10px;"|No.
! rowspan="2" style="width:10px;"|Nat.
! rowspan="2" scope="col" style="width:275px;"|Player
!colspan="4"|Ligue 1
!colspan="4"|Total
|- style="text-align:center;"
!width=40  |
!width=40  |
!width=40  |
!width=40  |
!width=40  |
!width=40  |
!width=40  |
!width=40  |
|-
|- align="center"
! colspan="15"| Goalkeepers
|- align="center"
|-
|| 1||||Mohamed Lamine Zemmamouche   
| 4 ||  || 1 ||  || 4 ||  || 1 || 
|-
||16||||Alexis Guendouz 
| 10 ||  || 1 ||  || 10 ||  || 1 || 
|-
||25||||Oussama Benbot 
| 19 ||  || 1 ||  || 19 ||  || 1 || 
|-
|- align="center"
! colspan="15"| Defenders
|- align="center"
|-
|| 2||||Houari Baouche       
| 16+2 ||  || 3 ||  || 16+2 ||  || 3 || 
|-
|| 3||||Abderrahim Hamra       
| 10+3 || 1 || 2 ||  || 10+3 || 1 || 2 || 
|-
|| 4||||Zineddine Belaïd
| 30 || 3 || 6 || 1 || 30 || 3 || 6 || 1
|-
|| 5||||Mustapha Bouchina       
| 14+5 ||  || 4 || 1 || 14+5 ||  || 4 || 1
|-
||12||||Haithem Loucif  
| 15+8 ||  || 1 ||  || 15+8 ||  || 1 || 
|-
||19||||Saâdi Radouani       
| 19+6 ||  || 1 ||  || 19+6 ||  || 1 || 
|-
||20||||Mehdi Beneddine       
| 1 ||  ||  ||  || 1 ||  ||  || 
|-
||21||||Adam Alilet       
| 9+3 || 1 || 1 ||  || 9+3 || 1 || 1 || 
|-
||22||||Fateh Achour       
| 8+4 ||  ||  ||  || 8+4 ||  ||  || 
|-
||27||||Ibrahim Bekakchi 
| 18 ||  ||  ||  || 18 ||  ||  || 
|-
|- align="center"
! colspan="15"| Midfielders
|- align="center"
|-
|| 6||||Oussama Chita       
| 5+9 ||  || 2 ||  || 5+9 ||  || 2 || 
|-
|| 8||||Kamel Belarbi       
| 1 ||  ||  ||  || 1 ||  ||  || 
|-
||14||||Brahim Benzaza 
| 17+7 || 1 || 2 || 1 || 17+7 || 1 || 2 || 1
|-
||15||||Messala Merbah 
| 18+5 || 1 || 7 || 2 || 18+5 || 1 || 7 || 2
|-
||17||||Taher Benkhelifa       
| 18+5 || 1 || 4 ||  || 18+5 || 1 || 4 || 
|-
||20||||Islam Merili       
| 2+3 ||  ||  ||  || 2+3 ||  ||  || 
|-
||23||||Hamza Koudri       
| 4 ||  ||  ||  || 4 ||  ||  || 
|-
||26||||Billel Benhammouda       
| 24+6 || 7 || 4 ||  || 24+6 || 7 || 4 || 
|-
|- align="center"
! colspan="15"| Forwards
|- align="center"
|-
|| 7||||Ismail Belkacemi
| 19+5 || 8 || 1 ||  || 19+5 || 8 || 1 || 
|-
||9||||Kwame Opoku
| 7+11 || 1 || 1 ||  || 7+11 || 1 || 1 || 
|-
||10||||Abderrahmane Meziane 
| 18+3 || 5 || 2 ||  || 18+3 || 5 || 2 || 
|-
||11||||Abdelkrim Zouari       
| 18+3 || 2 || 2 ||  || 18+3 || 2 || 2 || 
|-
||13||||Hamed Belem
| 1+6 ||  ||  ||  || 1+6 ||  ||  || 
|-
||18||||Aymen Mahious       
| 15+9 || 8 ||  ||  || 15+9 || 8 ||  || 
|-
||24||||Ibrahim Chenihi 
| 8+12 ||  || 1 ||  || 8+12 ||  || 1 || 
|-
||71||||Abderraouf Othmani
| 6+8 || 3 || 1 ||  || 6+8 || 3 || 1 || 
|-
||72||||Mohamed Ait El Hadj
| 10+2 || 2 || 1 ||  || 10+2 || 2 || 1 || 
|-
|- align="center"
! colspan="15"| Reserves
|- align="center"
|-
|| ||||Mohamed Djenidi
| 1 ||  ||  ||  || 1 ||  ||  || 
|-
|| ||||Abdelkader Belharrane
| 1 || 1 ||  ||  || 1 || 1 ||  || 
|-
|| ||||Abdelkrim Namani
| 1 ||  ||  ||  || 1 ||  ||  || 
|-
|| ||||Abdellah Azri
| 1 ||  || 1 ||  || 1 ||  || 1 || 
|-
|| ||||Amine Hadjam
| 1 ||  ||  ||  || 1 ||  ||  || 
|-
|| ||||Aymen Kennan
| 1 ||  ||  ||  || 1 ||  ||  || 
|-
|| ||||Houssam Zouraghi
| 1 ||  ||  ||  || 1 ||  ||  || 
|-
|| ||||Samy Bouali
| 1 ||  ||  ||  || 1 ||  ||  || 
|-
|| ||||Djelloul Bouteldji
| 1 ||  ||  ||  || 1 ||  ||  || 
|-
|| ||||Mostafa Bekane
| 1 ||  ||  ||  || 1 ||  ||  || 
|-
|| ||||Yasser Abdelkader Bourahli
| 1 ||  ||  ||  || 1 ||  ||  || 
|-
|| ||||Younes Douiri
| 0+1 ||  ||  ||  || 1 ||  ||  || 
|-
|- class="sortbottom"
|colspan="3" |Own goals
|! style="background:white; text-align: center;" |
| 0
|! colspan="3" style="background:white; text-align: center;" |
| 0
|! colspan="2" style="background:white; text-align: center;" |
|- class="sortbottom"
|colspan="4"  style="background:white; text-align: center;" |Totals
|45 ||50 ||5
|! rowspan="2" style="background:white; text-align: center;" |
|45 ||50 ||5

Goalscorers

Includes all competitive matches. The list is sorted alphabetically by surname when total goals are equal.

Penalties

Clean sheets
Includes all competitive matches.

Squad list
Players and squad numbers last updated on 17 June 2022.Note: Flags indicate national team as has been defined under FIFA eligibility rules. Players may hold more than one non-FIFA nationality.

Transfers

In

Out

New contracts

References

2021-22
Algerian football clubs 2021–22 season